Jiotsa Khrysopoulos (born 29 July 1969) is a Serbian-born Greek male handball player. He was a member of the Greece men's national handball team, playing as a goalkeeper. He was a part of the  team at the 2004 Summer Olympics. On club level he played for Barakaldo UPV Bilbao in Spain.

References

1969 births
Living people
Greek male handball players
Handball players at the 2004 Summer Olympics
Olympic handball players of Greece
People from Zemun